Peter William Byers (born 14 February 1944) is a retired New Zealand field hockey player. He played five matches at the 1964 Summer Olympics and scored one goal.

References

External links
 

1944 births
Living people
Olympic field hockey players of New Zealand
Field hockey players at the 1964 Summer Olympics